The Dr. Cobb Pilcher House is a historic house in Forest Hills, Tennessee, U.S.. It was built in 1936 for Dr. Cobb Pilcher, a neurologist at Vanderbilt University. It was designed in the International Style by Warfield and Keeble. It has been listed on the National Register of Historic Places since October 27, 2003.

References

Houses on the National Register of Historic Places in Tennessee
International style architecture in Tennessee
Houses completed in 1936
Buildings and structures in Davidson County, Tennessee